The men's shot put at the 2012 World Junior Championships in Athletics was held at the Estadi Olímpic Lluís Companys on 11 July.

Medalists

Records
, the existing world junior and championship records were as follows.

Results

Qualification
Qualification: Standard 19.30 m (Q) or at least best 12 qualified (q)

Final

Participation
According to an unofficial count, 39 athletes from 30 countries participated in the event.

References

External links
WJC12 shot put schedule

Shot Put
Shot put at the World Athletics U20 Championships